Calathaspis is a lichen genus in the family Cladoniaceae. The genus name, which combines the Greek κάλαθος (vase-shaped vessel) and κάλαθος ("shield"), refers to the shape of the apothecia. The species epithet devexa, from the Latin devexus ("sloping downward"), refers to the arrangement of the thalline laciniae.

References

Cladoniaceae
Lichen genera
Monotypic Lecanorales genera
Taxa described in 1972
Taxa named by William Alfred Weber